Al Dhafra Region, known until 2017 as "Al Gharbia" or the "Western Region", is one of three Municipal Regions in the Emirate of Abu Dhabi. Forming the western part of the United Arab Emirates, it is by far the largest region by area, occupying 71 % of the emirate's total area, yet the smallest by population and population density, and thus a rather remote region of the Emirate of Abu Dhabi, similar to the Eastern Region. The capital of Al Dhafra Region is Madinat Zayed (Bida Zayed). The new official name was already the historical name of the westernmost region of former Trucial Oman, which was Dhafrah. It is significant for its natural resources, particularly gas and petroleum. Its reserves of hydrocarbons account for 90% of the Emirate's reserves, which in turn account for 90% of the country's reserves, and are important for the local economy.

Demographics 
The Region had a population of 202,154 as of the Census of 2010 (including Islands Region with 17,646).

This region comprises seven townships, with population figures of the 2005 census of population (109,000 for the region):
 Madinat Zayed (Bida Zayed) (pop. 29,095)
 Ruwais (pop. 15,511)
 Ghayathi (pop. 14,022)
 Liwa (pop. 20,192)
 Al Mirfa (pop. 14,503)
 Sila (pop. 7,900, includes Ghuwaifat)
 Dalma (pop. 4,811)

Also of note is Habshan.

Al Gharbia's coastal communities are served with six Western Region Ports built, developed and managed by Abu Dhabi Ports Company (ADPC). These include Mugharrag, Al Sila, Sir Bani Yas, Dalma and Marfa Ports. The ports support local industries like fishing, tourism, logistics and leisure activities as well as facilitating the transport of people and goods to offshore islands.

Wildlife and prehistory 

7 million-year-old fossilized footprints of elephants have been discovered at a site named "Mleisa 1" in Al-Gharbia. Within the area of Baynunah, a camel-slaughter site dating to about 6,000 years ago was discovered.

See also 
 Abu Dhabi Region
 Hazza bin Sultan Al Nahyan
 List of cultural property of national significance in the United Arab Emirates
 List of tourist attractions in the United Arab Emirates
 Western Region Municipality

References

External links 
 Map of Al Gharbia Region
 Map with municipal boundaries
 Map of Abu Dhabi's Western Region Ports

 
Municipal regions in the Emirate of Abu Dhabi